Rabindra Tirtha Complex; Tagore Pilgrimage is a cultural center in Narkel Bagan, Action Area - I of New Town, Kolkata. It is dedicated to Rabindranath Tagore. It is a project developed by the HIDCO and houses an exhibition of Tagore’s paintings, archives, a research centre, an auditorium. and dormitories for students opting to conduct their research on Tagore. It was inaugurated by Mamata Banerjee, Chief Minister of West Bengal on 8 August 2012.

See also
HIDCO
Nazrul Tirtha

References

External links
 Official website

Memorials to Rabindranath Tagore
Monuments and memorials in Kolkata
New Town, Kolkata
Tourist attractions in North 24 Parganas district